Poole was a unitary authority in Dorset, England from 1997 to 2019. From 1974 until 1 April 1997 it was a non-metropolitan district. In 2019 it was abolished and subsumed into Bournemouth, Christchurch and Poole Council.

Political control
The first election to the council was held in 1973, ahead of the local government reorganisation coming into effect the following year. From 1973 until the council's abolition in 2019 political control of the council was held by the following parties:

Non-metropolitan district

Unitary authority

Leadership
The role of mayor was largely ceremonial at Poole Borough Council. Political leadership was instead provided by the leader of the council. The leaders from 2003 until the council's abolition in 2019 were:

Council elections

Non-metropolitan district elections
1973 Poole Borough Council election
1976 Poole Borough Council election
1979 Poole Borough Council election
1983 Poole Borough Council election (New ward boundaries)
1987 Poole Borough Council election
1991 Poole Borough Council election

Unitary authority elections
1996 Poole Borough Council election
1999 Poole Borough Council election
2003 Poole Borough Council election (New ward boundaries increased the number of seats by three)
2007 Poole Borough Council election
2011 Poole Borough Council election
2015 Poole Borough Council election (New ward boundaries)

Borough result maps

By-election results

Resignation of Cllr Andrew Muspratt and Cllr Marian Mackenzie

Resignation of Cllr Bob Dugdale

Death of Cllr Mary Hillman

Resignation of Cllr Daniel Martin

Resignation of Cllr Michael Plummer

Death of Cllr Brian Leverett

Resignation of Cllr Stephen Rollo-Smith.

Resignation of Cllr Joanne Tomlin.

References

External links
Poole Council
Poole election results
By-election results

 
Politics of Poole
Council elections in Dorset
Unitary authority elections in England